Adosopine is a dibenzoazepine drug that has been studied for the treatment of urinary incontinence.

References

Dibenzazepines